Kuršumlija is a town and municipality located in the Toplica District of the southern Serbia. It is situated near the rivers Toplica, Kosanica and Banjska, southeast of Mount Kopaonik and northwest of Mount Radan. As of 2022 census, the municipality has a population of 15,905 inhabitants.

Geography

Its borders the municipalities of Brus, Blace, Prokuplje, Medveđa, Podujevo, and Leposavić. Its southwest border (105 km) is within the disputed territory of Kosovo.

History
The Romans established the Ad Fines military outpost in the 3rd century AD. There are also remains of churches from the Byzantine period. The Serbian principality of Rascia expanded from this region. Stefan Nemanja, a Serbian lord (župan), and the founder of Nemanjić dynasty, built his residence here, as well as the two monasteries of St Nicolas and the Holy Mother of God (before 1168).

There are many historical sights in Kuršumlija from that era: Mara Tower, Ivan Tower, and many medieval churches. The name in that period was Bele Crkve (White Churches) and Toplica. After the invasion by the Ottoman Empire in the 14th century, the Ottomans gave the town its current name, simply by translating the old name, Bele Crkve (White Churches). During Ottoman rule Kuršumlija was part of the Sanjak of Niš. 

Toponyms such as Arbanaška and Đjake shows an Albanian presence in the Toplica and Southern Morava regions (located north-east of contemporary Kosovo) before the expulsion of Albanians during 1877–78 period.

The rural parts of Toplica valley and adjoining semi-mountainous interior was inhabited by compact Muslim Albanian population while Serbs in those areas lived near the river mouths and mountain slopes and both peoples inhabited other regions of the South Morava river basin.

As the wider Toplica region, Kuršumlija also had an Albanian majority.  These Albanians were expelled by Serbian forces in a way that today would be characterized as ethnic cleansing. According to the travels of M. Rakić, There were 127 villages in the Kuršumlija district, with Kuršumlija being the only town. After the Serbo-Ottoman war in 1878, the town remained completely vacant after the war. The Muslims who left the region were Albanians. It is estimated that approximately 17,604 Albanians left the Kuršumlija district during this time.

In 1878, Kuršumlija became a part of the Principality of Serbia, which in 1882 became the Kingdom of Serbia. From 1929 to 1941, Kuršumlija was part of the Morava Banovina of the Kingdom of Yugoslavia.

1999 NATO bombing
Kuršumlija was bombed on multiple occasions during the 1999 NATO bombing of Yugoslavia. The Yugoslav army barracks were struck by NATO bombs on March 24, 1999, after which nine officers and two soldiers were killed. A total of 41 soldiers were injured in the same bombing that night. On April 12, 1999, six civilians were killed in Merdare from NATO airstrikes on the border of Kuršumlija and Podujevo.

Settlements
Aside from the town of Kuršumlija, the following villages consist the municipality of Kuršumlija:

Demographics

The municipality of Kuršumlija includes one urban and 89 rural settlements. As of 2022 census, the municipality has a population of 15,905 inhabitants. As of 2011 census, the municipality of Kuršumlija has 6,962 households with 2,76 members on average, while the number of homes is 11,374.

The religious structure of the municipality is predominantly Serbian Orthodox (18,764), with minorities like Atheists (22), Muslims (17), Catholics (14) and others. Most of the population speaks Serbian (18,687).

The composition of population by sex and average age:
 Male - 9,862 (41.54 years) and
 Female - 9,351 (44.43 years).

A total of 7,356 citizens (older than 15 years) have secondary education (44.8%), while 1,606 citizens have higher education (9.8%). Of those with higher education, 898 (5.5%) have university education.

Ethnic groups
The ethnic composition of the municipality:

Tourism
Kuršumlija is known for a natural monument of hoodoos near Mount Radan known as Đavolja Varoš ('Devil's Town'). There are three spas (banjas): the Prolom Banja, Kuršumlijska Banja, and Lukovska Banja. Prolom water is bottled at the Prolom Spa.

Economy
The following table gives a preview of total number of registered people employed in legal entities per their core activity (as of 2018):

Gallery

Notable natives or residents

The most notable Grand Prince of Serbia, Stefan Nemanja, established his first capital, Bele Crkve, near the location of today's Kuršumlija in 1166–1172. His wife, Grand Princess Anastasia (Ana), died and was buried here as a nun, St. Anastasia Nemanjic.
Sultania Mara, daughter of Despot Đurađ Branković, later wife of the Ottoman Emperor Murad II, and step mother of Emperor Mehmed II also at the end of her life came to live here as a nun in monastery of Holy Mother of God, where she made a fortress called Mara Tower. She died in around 1487.
Kosta Pećanac, a notable Serbian soldier in the First and Second World War. His house is protected of by the municipality.
Dragoljub Mićunović (born in 1930. in Merdare, Kuršumlija), professor of at the University of Belgrade Faculty of Philosophy. He was a dissident during the Communist period, and the first president of the Democratic Party. He was the first president of parliament of State Union of Serbia & Montenegro.
 Momčilo Đokić, He played a total of 13 matches for the Yugoslavia national football team. His debut was on April 13, 1930, against Bulgaria, in Belgrade, a 6–1 win, and his fairway match was on December 13, 1936, in Paris against France, a 0–1 loss. He played all the matches at the 1930 FIFA World Cup in Uruguay.
 Žarko Dragojević, director, born in Kuršumlija, professor at the Faculty of Drama at the University of Belgrade. He also directed many documentaries, among them series on Serbian monasteries for the Serbian national broadcaster (RTS).
 Vojin Šulović, academician, humanist, doctor of gynaecology. 7 July and October awards of city of Belgrade winner. Also Serbian medical society award winner and Serbian warrior medallist. Smederevo and Kuršumlija municipality freeman.

See also
 Toplica District
 Administrative divisions of Serbia

References

External links

 

 
Populated places in Toplica District
Municipalities and cities of Southern and Eastern Serbia